Angwin is a census-designated place (CDP) in Napa County, California, best known as the site of Pacific Union College. It is part of the northern San Francisco Bay Area. The population was 3,051 at the 2010 census. Its area code is 707. Its two zip codes are 94508 and 94576. It is in the Pacific time zone.

History
The town of Angwin is named for Edwin Angwin (1841–1919), a native of St. Agnes,  Cornwall, who in 1875 purchased a  parcel within the Rancho La Jota on Howell Mountain and established the Angwin Resort. By the 1900s, Mr. Angwin owned almost  of land in the area.

Prior to 1875, Rancho La Jota was held in its entirety by William Campbell Watson, husband of Elizabeth Anne Davis, the granddaughter of George C. Yount. Mr. Watson began to sell off portions of the Rancho in 1875, Mr. Angwin's being among the first parcels. Soon after a community began to emerge with the success of, and in support of, the Angwin Resort.

In 1909, Healdsburg College (formerly Healdsburg Academy), a Seventh-day Adventist college, moved from its location in Healdsburg when it purchased the Angwin Resort for $60,000 to open Pacific Union College.

In August 2020, Angwin was evacuated due to the Hennessey Fire.

Geography

Angwin is located within the Howell Mountain AVA.

Climate
Angwin's Pacific Union College has maintained a National Weather Service cooperative weather station since 1940.

Demographics

2010

At the 2010 census Angwin had a population of 3,051. The racial makeup of Angwin was 2,124 (69.6%) White, 139 (4.6%) African American, 22 (0.7%) Native American, 339 (11.1%) Asian, 5 (0.2%) Pacific Islander, 234 (7.7%) from other races, and 188 (6.2%) from two or more races. Hispanic or Latino of any race were 625 people (20.5%).

The census reported that 2,058 people (67.5% of the population) lived in households, 944 (30.9%) lived in non-institutionalized group quarters, and 49 (1.6%) were institutionalized.

There were 824 households, 233 (28.3%) had children under the age of 18 living in them, 461 (55.9%) were opposite-sex married couples living together, 66 (8.0%) had a female householder with no husband present, 33 (4.0%) had a male householder with no wife present.  There were 28 (3.4%) unmarried opposite-sex partnerships, and 7 (0.8%) same-sex married couples or partnerships. 209 households (25.4%) were one person and 38 (4.6%) had someone living alone who was 65 or older. The average household size was 2.50.  There were 560 families (68.0% of households); the average family size was 2.93.

The age distribution was 413 people (13.5%) under the age of 18, 1,146 people (37.6%) aged 18 to 24, 565 people (18.5%) aged 25 to 44, 672 people (22.0%) aged 45 to 64, and 255 people (8.4%) who were 65 or older.  The median age was 24.4 years. For every 100 females, there were 102.3 males.  For every 100 females age 18 and over, there were 100.8 males.

There were 912 housing units at an average density of 187.2 per square mile, of the occupied units 429 (52.1%) were owner-occupied and 395 (47.9%) were rented. The homeowner vacancy rate was 0.2%; the rental vacancy rate was 5.9%.  1,131 people (37.1% of the population) lived in owner-occupied housing units and 927 people (30.4%) lived in rental housing units.

2000
At the 2000 census there were 3,148 people, 811 households, and 587 families in the CDP. The racial makeup of the CDP in 2010 was 59.7% non-Hispanic White, 4.2% non-Hispanic Black or African American, 0.3% Native American, 10.7% Asian, 0.2% Pacific Islander, 0.4% from other races, and 4.0% from two or more races. 20.5% of the population were Hispanic or Latino of any race.
Of the 811 households 30.0% had children under the age of 18 living with them, 62.6% were married couples living together, 6.7% had a female householder with no husband present, and 27.6% were non-families. 20.8% of households were one person and 3.6% were one person aged 65 or older.  The average household size was 2.68 and the average family size was 3.06.

The age distribution was 15.4% under the age of 18, 36.8% from 18 to 24, 20.5% from 25 to 44, 18.9% from 45 to 64, and 8.4% 65 or older.  The median age was 24 years. For every 100 females, there were 95.6 males.  For every 100 females age 18 and over, there were 91.8 males.

The median household income was $56,453 and the median family income  was $63,972. Males had a median income of $46,589 versus $34,917 for females. The per capita income for the CDP was $20,126.  About 5.5% of families and 8.4% of the population were below the poverty line, including 14.0% of those under age 18 and 4.9% of those age 65 or over.

Government

References

Census-designated places in Napa County, California
Vaca Mountains
Census-designated places in California